Gongnong Township is a township under the administration of Tieli, Heilongjiang, China. , it has 10 villages under its administration.

References 

Township-level divisions of Heilongjiang
Tieli